DMeOB is a drug used in scientific research which acts as a negative allosteric modulator of the metabotropic glutamate receptor subtype mGluR5.

References

MGlu5 receptor antagonists
Hydrazones